William Walter Hay (1908-1998) was an American civil engineer and professor remembered with the annual American Railway Engineering and Maintenance-of-Way Association (AREMA) Hay Award recognizing outstanding achievements in railway engineering.

Early years 
William W. Hay was born in Bay City, Michigan, and completed a Bachelor of Science degree in management engineering at Carnegie Mellon University in 1931.  After working briefly for the Pennsylvania Railroad, he undertook advanced coursework in railway operations at Yale University before returning to the Pennsylvania Railroad and later the Long Island Rail Road and Pittsburgh and Lake Erie Railroad.  He rose to the rank of Lieutenant colonel with the United States Army Military Railway Service in both the European and Pacific theaters during World War II.

University of Illinois 
After working briefly for the Reading Railroad after the war, he joined the University of Illinois Urbana-Champaign faculty in 1947 and completed a Master of Science in Civil engineering in 1948.  His Railroad Engineering textbook was published by John Wiley & Son in 1953.  He was the Professor of Railway Civil Engineering from completion of his Doctor of Philosophy degree in 1956 until he retired in 1977.  He continued teaching as an emeritus professor until 1989.

AREMA Hay Award 
Following Dr. Hay's death in 1998, the AREMA board of directors and committee on engineering economics established the annual William W. Hay Award to recognize these outstanding achievements in Railway Engineering:
 1999: BNSF Railway – Thayer Blitz Project
 2000: Amtrak – Northeast Corridor Improvement Project
 2001: CSX Transportation – Baltimore and Ohio Railroad Capacity Improvement Project
 2002: Alameda Corridor Transportation Authority – Alameda Corridor Project
 2003: Port Authority of New York and New Jersey and AirRail Transit Consortium – AirTrain JFK
 2004: Port Authority of New York and New Jersey – Restoration of PATH Commuter Rail Service to Lower Manhattan and Exchange Place, Jersey City
 2005: TranSystems Corporation – Renaissance of the Kansas City Junction
 2006: CSX Transportation and Norfolk Southern Railway – Hurricane Katrina Recovery Efforts
 2007: Norfolk Southern Railway – Keystone Buildout Project
 2008: Union Pacific Railroad – Grant Tower Realignment Project
 2009: Union Pacific Railroad – Frazier Landslide Clean-up and Construction Project on the Cascade Subdivision in Oregon
 2010: Norfolk Southern Railway – Heartland Corridor Clearance Improvement Project
 2011: CSX Intermodal Terminals, Inc. – Northwest Ohio Intermodal freight transport Terminal Project
 2012: BNSF Railway – Overcoming the 2011 Floods
 2013: Utah Transit Authority – FrontRunner South Commuter Rail Line
 2014: Union Pacific Railroad – Santa Teresa, New Mexico, Terminal
 2015: Union Pacific Railroad and BNSF Railway – Tower 55 Multimodal Improvement Project
 2016: TranSystems Corporation – Englewood, Chicago, P-1 Flyover Project
 2017: Washington State Department of Transportation and BNSF Railway – Improvements for Passenger Rail Service and Reliability
 2018: Arup – Fulton Center in New York City
 2019: KiwiRail – Main North Line Earthquake Recovery Project in New Zealand
 2020: Hanson Professional Services Inc. - Norfolk Southern’s Grand River Bridge Emergency Repairs in Brunswick, Missouri
 2021: Canadian National Railway - Construction of the New McComb Bonnet Carré Spillway Bridge

References 

1908 births
Carnegie Mellon University alumni
University of Illinois Urbana-Champaign alumni
United States Army personnel of World War II
United States Army officers